The Shengwulian or Sheng-wu-lien (an acronym for the Hunan Provincial Proletarian Revolutionary Great Alliance Committee) was a radical ultra-left group formed in 1967 during the Cultural Revolution. The rebel group became known for its opposition to local authorities installed by Beijing and for creatively re-interpreting the Cultural Revolution's official doctrine, becoming active during a period when the political trends of the Cultural Revolution were moving away from mass political mobilization.

Background 
The Shengwulian was formed in 1967 during the Cultural Revolution, at a stage when the overall political trends were moving away from mass political movement. It arose in Hunan province. The group attracted many people with grievances from having been marginalized in Chinese social life or having been politically targeted. An organization with loose structure and fluid membership, its ranks included People's Liberation Army veterans, "Black Devils" (victims of political campaigns, especially people categorized as bourgeois rightists in the 1950s), and rusticated urban youth. It had ties with economistic groups and drew broad popular support in Hunan from small neighborhood cooperatives (where wages were generally inferior compared to the state-sector industry). The ultimate commonality was "all had been persecuted or shortchanged by the state and Party apparatus before and during the Cultural Revolution." The Shengwulian comprised more than 20 such organizations, which coordinated their activities through a Central Committee (where a representative from each constituent organization sat) and a smaller standing committee. These groups were forced to unite when the political balance of power swung in favor of rebel Red Guards deemed more reliable by the party center. 

Ultimately, the Shengwulian was denounced, including by Kang Sheng who denigrated the group as "anarchists" and "Trotskyists," and suppressed by the Chinese leadership.

Ideology 
The Shengwulian was a self-styled ultra-left group. It sought to emulate the Paris Commune as the historical example of popular power and argued that China's "new bureaucratic bourgeoisie" would have to be destroyed to establish a genuinely egalitarian society. Historian Maurice Meisner writes that one of its inspirations may have been Qi Benyu, one of the last ultra-left intellectuals remaining in the Cultural Revolution Group (and who was purged in 1968 around the same time authorities suppressed the Shengwulian).

The Shengwulian opposed revolutionary committees, arguing that the committees failed to transform the political system and had the practical effect of excluding radical Red Guards from power. The group's tone "was one of frustration at the limitations of the Cultural Revolution, which the Shengwulian faulted for holding back from a structural solution to China's political problems." As Meisner summarized: 

Maoist leadership rejected these ideas, but the Shengwulian's views nonetheless spread beyond its local environment in China and also into the West. Its legacy is one of creative re-interpretation of the official doctrine arising during the Cultural Revolution.

The group's significant political writings include its Program and Yang Xiguang's "Whither China?"  Whither China? argued that the central conflict in China during the Cultural Revolution was not between Mao Zedong's proponents and opponents, or between the proletariat and the former wealthy, but instead between the masses and a "Red capitalist class" that was "decadent" and impeding historical progress. It was passed hand-to-hand among Rebel Red Guards, spread by authorities as "material to be criticized," and reached a readership of many hundreds of thousands during the Cultural Revolution.

Alluding to Mao's comment that 95% of Party cadres were good or comparatively good while 5% should be purged, the Shengwulian argued that 90% of the cadres formed a red capitalist class that should be removed and replaced by a political system modeled after the Paris Commune.

Academic analysis 
Sociologist Andrew G. Walder writes that the Shenwulian's opposition to a "red capitalist class" "did not issue from a coalition of the marginalized, but [was] instead the product of a split over tactics within the rebel movement, a rhetorical framing of diehard resistance that was not widely shared even within the splinter faction that generated the [Whither China?] essay."

According to Jonathan Unger, the Shengwulian became the Cultural Revolution's most famous ultra-left grouping.

References 

1967 establishments in China
Organizations in Cultural Revolution
Communes
History of Hunan
History of Changsha